Lost Gospel may refer to:
 The Lost Gospel (Jacobovici and Wilson book),  book by Simcha Jacobovici and Barrie Wilson
 The Lost Gospel,  book by  Burton L.  Mack  about the Q document 
 New Testament apocrypha